Mushi can refer to:

Mushi, Afghanistan
Mushi, Tengzhou (木石镇), town in Tengzhou City, Shandong, China
Mushi, an album by Japanese hardcore punk group The Stalin. 
Mushi (biblical figure), an individual mentioned in the Hebrew Bible.
Mushi, the creatures in the Japanese manga Mushishi.
Refugee alias of Iroh
Mushi Production
Mushi Sanban, a fictional character in the animated series Codename: Kids Next Door